Diastictis sperryorum is a moth in the family Crambidae. It was described by Eugene Munroe, a Canadian entomologist, in 1956. 

The wingspan is 22–25 mm. Adults are on wing from February to August.

Distribution 
It has been recorded in North America. The Diastictis Sperryorum is present mainly in California, although it has been recorded in New Mexico, Arizona Oklahoma and Texas.

Appearance 
The Diastictis sperryorum has brown wings with white dots spread all over them.

References

Moths described in 1956
Spilomelinae